U.S. Route 31A (US 31A)  is a  alternate route of U.S. Route 31 that exists between Nashville and Pulaski, Tennessee. It is located entirely in Middle Tennessee and except for the Lewisburg bypass, where it is concurrent with SR 106, it is entirely concurrent with unsigned State Route 11 (SR 11).

Route description

US 31A begins in Giles County in Pulsaki at an intersection with US 31 (SR 7) just north of downtown. It winds its way northeast through the hilly terrain of the Highland Rim for several miles to cross into Marshall County at an interchange with I-65 (Exit 22).

The highway then passes through the town of Cornersville, where it has a long concurrency with SR 129, before continuing northeast to enter Nashville Basin and the city of Lewisburg at an intersection with US 31A Business. Here SR 11 splits off and follows US 31A Business through downtown while US 31A follows a bypass route to the east (SR 106). It passes through neighborhoods before becoming concurrent with SR 272 and passing through a mix business and industrial areas. The highway then becomes concurrent with US 431 at an intersection with US 431 Business (SR 50) and they curve to the northwest to cross a bridge over a creek before coming to another intersection with US 31A Business/US 431 Business (SR 11), where US 31A, SR 11, and SR 272 split off and head northeast, with SR 272 splitting off shortly thereafter. US 31A continues northeast through farmland for several miles to pass through the community of Farmington, where it has an intersection between SR 64 and SR 271, before crossing the Duck River at Henry Horton State Park. It then enters the city limits of Chapel Hill, where it becomes concurrent with SR 99 and has an intersection with SR 270, before passing through downtown. SR 99 splits off and goes east shortly thereafter and US 31A then leaves Chapel Hill and passes through rural farmland for several miles to cross into Williamson County.

US 31A straddles the county line with Rutherford County for several miles, where it passes through the community of Allisona and has an intersection with SR 269, before re entering Williamson County to pass through the communities of College Grove and Kirkland, where it becomes concurrent with US 41A (SR 16) and crosses over the Harpeth River. US 31A/US 41A head north to pass through the community of Triune, where they have an interchange with I-840 (Exit 42) and have an intersection with SR 96, before passing through some hills to pass through the town of Nolensville and cross into Davidson County.

The highway immediately enters the Nashville city limits and passes northwest through suburban areas for several miles as Nolensville Pike, where it has intersections with SR 253 (Concord R, SR 254 (Old Hickory Boulevard), SR 255 (Harding Place), and SR 155 (Thompson Lane), as well as crossing over Mill Creek and Sevenmile Creek. US 31A/US 41A then begin passing through business districts as it has an interchange with I-440 (Four-Forty Parkway; Exit 6) before the highway splits into a one-way pair between 4th Avenue S and 2nd Avenue S. They then become concurrent with US 41/US 70S (SR 1/Lafayette Street) at an interchange with I-40 (Exit 210C). They turn west for a short distance before US 31A comes to an end at an roundabout with US 31 (SR 6/8th Avenue S).

Major intersections

Lewisburg business route

U.S. Route 31A Business (US 31A Business or US 31A Bus) is a Business route of U.S. Route 31A in Lewisburg, Tennessee, following US 31A’s original alignment through downtown. It is concurrent with unsigned State Route 11 (SR 11) for its entire length.

US 31A Bus begins at an intersection with US 31A (Cornersville Highway/S Ellington Parkway/SR 11/SR 106) at the southern edge of the city. It heads north along S 2nd Avenue to pass through neighborhoods for approximately two miles, where it crosses a bridge over a creek, before crossing under a railroad overpass to enter downtown. US 31A Bus then comes to an intersection with US 431 Bus (SR 50/E Commerce Street) and SR 373 (W Commerce Avenue), where US 31A Bus becomes concurrent with US 431 Bus/SR 50 and they traverse a roundabout around the Marshall County Courthouse before heading north along N 2nd Avenue. They pass by some more businesses before SR 50 splits off and heads northwest along College Street and Franklin Avenue. US 31A Bus/US 41A Bus turn northeast along Verona Avenue and pass through some neighborhoods before they come to an end at an intersection with US 31A/US 431/SR 106/SR 272 (N Ellington Parkway/Nashville Highway).

References

A
31A
31A
Transportation in Giles County, Tennessee
Transportation in Marshall County, Tennessee
Transportation in Williamson County, Tennessee
Transportation in Rutherford County, Tennessee
Transportation in Davidson County, Tennessee
Transportation in Nashville, Tennessee